Saint Gordianus (died 362) was a Roman martyr who was killed during the reign of Julian the Apostate, and is commemorated on 10 May.

Gordianus was a Roman pagan and judge.  He was charged with forcing Januarius to make a sacrifice to the Emperor, but instead was persuaded and then converted to Christianity with many within his household. Being accused before his successor, or as some say before the prefect of the city, Apronianus, he was cruelly tortured and finally beheaded. His body was carried off by the Christians, and laid in a crypt on the Latin Way beside the body of Saint Epimachus, who had been recently interred there. The two saints gave their name to the cemetery, and have ever since been jointly venerated by the Catholic Church.

Some time later the remains of Gordianus were moved to the Cyriaca cemetery and there they lay until the 17th century when Brother Ambrose of the Order of St Augustin removed them and gave them to Fr Christopher Anderson, a Jesuit priest in the 1670s. The remains were transferred to the Jesuit College of St. Omer; when the College moved to Stonyhurst, the remains travelled to England where they have remained since, interred below the altar of the Sodality Chapel.  His bones were temporarily removed in 2006 whilst the chapel underwent restoration, but they have since been returned.

The Princely Abbey of Kempten in Bavaria was established in 752, and dedicated to the Virgin Mary and Sts. Gordianus and Epimachus. Some of the relics of the two saints were brought there.

There is a church dedicated to Saint Gordianus in Saint-Paul-d'Oueil in France.

References

Stonyhurst College
362 deaths
4th-century Christian martyrs
Year of birth unknown